Francesco Robortello (1516–1567) was a Renaissance humanist, nicknamed Canis grammaticus ("the grammatical dog") for his confrontational and demanding manner.

As scholar

Robortello, who was born in Udine, was an editor of rediscovered works of Antiquity, who taught philosophy and rhetoric, as well as ethics (following Aristotle), and Latin and Greek, roving from Padua through universities at Lucca, Pisa, Venice, Padua, and Bologna before finally returning to Padua in 1560.

Robortello's scientific approach to textual emendations laid the groundwork for modern Hermeneutics. His commentary on Aristotle's Poetics formed the basis for Renaissance and 17th century theories of comedy, influential in writing for the theatre everywhere save in England. At the same time he was the conservative Aristotelian philosopher who urged woman to submit her will to that of her husband on the basis of her moral weakness, in his libro politicos: Aristotelis disputatio (Venice, 1552, p. 175, quoted Comensoli 1989).

He followed his In librum Aristotelis de arte poetica explicationes (1548), in which he emended the Latin version of Alessandro de’ Pazzi (published 1536), with a paraphrase of Horace's Ars Poetica and with explications of genres missing in the surviving text of Aristotle: De Satyra, De Epigrammate, De Comoedia, De Salibus, De Elegia.

In the fields of philology and history he sustained controversies in print with Carolus Sigonius and Vincenzo Maggi in the form of essay-like orations, correcting the editions published in Venice by Aldus Manutius, and even philological missteps of Erasmus. These brief essays were collected and published at intervals. A convention of surveys of Italian linguistics (Gensini 1993) is to start with Robortello.

Robortello died at Padua, where, in the 1550s, one of his pupils was Giacomo Zabarella. Another pupil was Jan Kochanowski, a poet who wrote both in Polish and Latin and introduced the ideas, forms and spirit of the Renaissance into Polish literature.

Main works
De historica facultate disputatio (alternatively as De arte historica), 1548; 1567. An incunable of historiography.
De rhetorica facultate, 1548
In Aristotelis poeticam explicationes, Florence 1548, 2nd edition 1555. Reinterpreting Aristotle's Poetics for the humanist.
Dionysi Longini rhetoris praestantissimi liber de grandi sive sublimiorationis genere ... cum adnotationibus, Basel 1554. Recovering the lost literary criticism of Longinus, On the Sublime.
Thesaurus criticus, 1557, second edition,  1604
De arte, sive ratione corrigendi antiquorum libros disputatio, Florence 1548;  2nd edition 1562 This "Lecture on the art and method of correcting the books of the old writers" was one of the first critical discussions of the methodologies to apply in correcting texts of Antiquity.
De artificio dicendi 1567. A textbook of rhetoric.

Notes

References
Ryan, E. E. "Robortello and Maggi on Aristotle's Theory of Catharsis". in Rinascimento XXII (1982) pp 263–273.

External links
 Franciscus Robortellus (Francesco Robortello) 
Italica: Rinascimento" Francesco Robortello  
Viviana Comensoli, "Gender and Eloquence in Dekker's The Honest Whore, Part II," note.
Theaterbase: Barret H. Clark, Italian Dramatic Criticism of the Renaissance. Context of Robortello's works.

Further reading
María José Vega, La formación de la teoría de la comedia: Francesco Robortello.
Edward John Kenney, 1974 The Classical Text: Aspects of Editing in the Age of the Printed Book (University of California), 1974), especially pp 29–36.

Italian Renaissance humanists
Latin commentators on Aristotle
1516 births
1567 deaths
Academic staff of the University of Pisa